Hugueninia tanacetifolia, the tansy-leaved rocket, is a species of flowering plant in the monotypic genus Hugueninia belonging to the family Brassicaceae. Sometimes it is placed in genus Sisymbrium. Molecular genetic studies have shown it to be most closely related to, and possibly ancestral to the Canary Islands endemic species within the genus Descurainia.

Etymology
The genus name honors Auguste Huguenin, botanist of Savoie of the nineteenth century. The Latin name of the species means "with leaves of tansy" because of the similarity of the leaves with some species of the genus Tanacetum.

Description

This perennial stellate herb has erect glabrous or slightly hairy stem, branched at the top. Leaves are alternate, soft, up to 20 cm long, with a short petiole, lanceolate, toothed on the edges, imparipinnate with 5-10 pairs of segments. The small yellow cruciform flowers in small racemes bloom from June to August.

Distribution
Tansy-leaved rocket is native to mountains of the Iberian Peninsula, France, Italy, Switzerland, the Pyrenees and the southwestern Alps.

Habitat

References
Christoper Brickell (Editor-in-chief): RHS A-Z Encyclopedia of Garden Plants. Third edition. Dorling Kindersley, London 2003
Pignatti 1982, Flora d'Italia. Bologna, Edagricole, 1982

Specific

External links
Biolib
USDA
Tropicos
Luirig.altervista
Hortipedia

Brassicaceae